André was a rock band from Montreal, Quebec, Canada. The band was made up of Maxime Philibert (guitar, vocals), Frédérick St-Onge (drums, vocals) Louis Therrien-Galasso (bass, guitar, vocals), and guitarists André Papanicolaou and David Bussières.

Between 2001 and 2009, the band released four albums and its music was included in three compilations. The band received a MuchMusic Video Award nomination for Best French Video at the 2006 MuchMusic Video Awards for "Yolande Wong".

Discography

Singles

Albums

References

Canadian punk rock groups
Musical groups from Montreal
Musical groups established in 2001
2001 establishments in Quebec